The 2012 Challenge Cup (also known as the Carnegie Challenge Cup for sponsorship reasons) was the 111th staging of the most competitive European rugby league tournament at club level and was open to teams from England, Wales, Scotland and France. It began its preliminary stages in January 2012.

The pools in the preliminary round were dropped.

Wigan Warriors were the reigning champions, but lost 28 - 39 to Leeds Rhinos in the semi final, who avenged last season's final defeat. However, they went on to lose their third consecutive final, the second of which to the Warrington Wolves 18 - 35.

Preliminary round

A total of 44 teams played a Preliminary Round tie. The clubs involved included 22 NCL Divisions 1 and 2, 5 regional league winners, the Yorkshire and Lancashire County Cup winners, 1 Cumberland ARL nomination and the British Police.
Also in the draw were the Scottish champions and a Welsh representative, 4 teams from the 2011 Rugby League Conference National, 6 Student teams and a North West League representative.

The Draw for the Preliminary and First Round were made on 19 December 2011.

Round 1
The 22 winners from the preliminary round then progress to the First Round where 11 games were drawn. Due to the amount of postponed matches, ties (other than Egremont v Leeds Met and Castleford Lock Lane v Sharlston) were played a week later on 25 February.

Round 2

The 11 First Round winners then progressed to Round Two where they met the 14 National Conference League Premier teams and the three Armed Forces teams who entered at this stage to total 28 teams to be drawn into 14 games.

The Draw for the Second Round were made on 27 February 2012 aboard  and was carried out by Commanding Officer, Captain Martin Connell, who drew the home teams and the away teams were pulled out by England Head Coach Steve McNamara.

The second round ties were played on the weekend of 10 and 11 March.

Round 3
A total of 14 community clubs would progress to Round Three, where they would be joined by the Co-operative Championships clubs as well as Toulouse Olympique and Lézignan Sangliers.

Cumbrian Rugby League stars Sol Roper and Rob Purdham conducted the draw for the third round of the Carnegie Challenge Cup at Whitehaven's Recreation Ground on 13 March. Roper, a scrum-half who played in two Wembley finals with Workington Town in 1955 and 1958, drew the home teams and former Whitehaven and London Broncos player Purdham drew the away teams.

Notes
A. Game switched to Recreation Ground (Whitehaven) 
B. Game switched to Rapid Solicitors Stadium (Wakefield)
C. Game switched to Cougar Park (Keighley) 
D. Game switched to Bigfellas Stadium (Featherstone)
E. Game switched to Spotland (Rochdale)
F. Game switched to The Shay (Halifax)

Round 4

The draw for Round 4 took place at 8.50pm on 26 March 2012 and was conducted by Challenge Cup winners Andy Gregory and Lee Crooks. The games took place over the weekend of 13, 14 and 15 April 2012 with BBC Sport showing the tie between Widnes Vikings and St. Helens and for the first time Sky Sports televised the Featherstone Rovers v Castleford Tigers.

Round 5
The draw, which took place at 3:00pm on 16 April 2012 had an Olympic and Paralympic theme with the last 16 teams drawn by two athletes who were hoping for medal success at London 2012, Johanna Jackson and Louis Speight. Round 5 took place over the weekend of 28 and 29 April 2012,

Quarter finals
The quarter finals took place over the weekend of 12 and 13 May 2012. Two games were shown live on the BBC and one on Sky Sports. The draw took place on 1 May 2012 at 8:20am BST, and was broadcast on BBC 5 Live.

Semi finals
The semi-finals took place on 14 and 15 July 2012 at neutral venues and both games were televised by the BBC. The draw took place on 13 May after the Catalans-Warrington match on BBC Two with the draw made by Ian Millward and Brian Noble

Note:
A. Match originally scheduled for 17:30 kick-off, but was delayed by 15 minutes due to BBC's coverage of Scottish Open golf over-running.

Final

The final was played on 25 August 2012 at Wembley Stadium with a 14:30 kick off time and was shown live on BBC One. The game was a repeat of the 2010 Challenge Cup final, where Warrington beat Leeds 30–6. In the final the Warrington Wolves won the Challenge Cup for a third time in four years, beating Leeds 35–18.

Teams:

Warrington: Brett Hodgson, Chris Riley, Ryan Atkins, Stefan Ratchford, Joel Monaghan, Lee Briers, Richie Myler, Garreth Carvell, Mickey Higham, Chris Hill, Trent Waterhouse, Ben Westwood, Ben Harrison
Replacements: Adrian Morley (c), Michael Monaghan, Paul Wood, Tyrone McCarthy Coach: Tony Smith
Tries: Monaghan, Waterhouse, Riley, Atkins, McCarthy, Hogdson. Goals: Hodgson (5).

Leeds: Zak Hardaker, Ben Jones-Bishop, Kallum Watkins, Carl Ablett, Ryan Hall, Kevin Sinfield (c), Stevie Ward, Kylie Leuluai, Rob Burrow, Jamie Peacock, Jamie Jones-Buchanan, Brett Delaney, Ryan Bailey
Replacements: Ian Kirke, Shaun Lunt, Darrell Griffin, Jimmy Keinhorst Coach: Brian McDermott
Tries: Kirke, Watkins (2) Goals: Sinfield (3).

UK Broadcasting rights
The tournament was jointly televised by the BBC and Sky Sports on the first of their five-year contracts.

 Only in England and Wales.

Sky Sports televised the Round 4 match between Featherstone Rovers and Castleford Tigers on 12 April 2012 and the Round 5 match between Featherstone Rovers and Wigan Warriors on 27 April 2012 as well as a quarter final.

References

External links
 Challenge Cup official website
 2012 Challenge Cup Coverage at the Guardian

Challenge Cup
Challenge Cup
Challenge Cup
2012 in French rugby league
2012 in Welsh rugby league
2012 in Scottish sport